The 1948 New Mexico A&M Aggies football team was an American football team that represented New Mexico College of Agriculture and Mechanical Arts (now known as New Mexico State University) as a member of the Border Conference during the 1948 college football season.  In their first year under head coach Vaughn Corley, the Aggies compiled a 3–7 record (0–4 against conference opponents), finished last in the conference, and were outscored by a total of 391 to 138. The team played its home games on Quesenberry Field.

Schedule

References

New Mexico AandM
New Mexico State Aggies football seasons
New Mexico AandM Aggies football